Curtis Thorn (born 2 September 1995) is an English professional footballer who plays as a defender for Miami FC in USL Championship.

Career

Youth, college and amateur
Thorn was part of the Fulham academy for three years. He later went on to play for Wessex League sides Alton and Team Solent.

Thorn moved to the United States in 2018, and played two years of college soccer at Nova Southeastern University between 2018 and 2019, making a total of 33 appearances, scoring four goals and tallying assists. He was named to the Fall SSC Commissioner's Honor Roll in both seasons with the Sharks, received All-South Region honors from the D2CCA and United Soccer Coaches and was the team MVP in 2019.

While at college, Thorn appeared for NPSL side New Orleans Jesters in 2018, where he was named MVP. In 2019 he played for USL League Two side South Georgia Tormenta FC 2 helping them to the Deep South Division title and the clubs first Southern Conference title.

Professional
On 27 August 2020, Thorn signed with USL League One side South Georgia Tormenta. He made his professional debut on 11 September 2020, starting in a 2–2 draw with Union Omaha.

On 23 December 2022, Thorn signed a multi-year contract with USL Championship side Miami FC.

References

External links
 
 Profile at Nova Southeastern University Athletics
 Profile at Wessex League

1995 births
Living people
Association football defenders
English footballers
English expatriate footballers
English expatriate sportspeople in the United States
Expatriate soccer players in the United States
Miami FC players
National Premier Soccer League players
New Orleans Jesters players
Nova Southeastern Sharks men's soccer players
Tormenta FC players
USL League One players
USL League Two players
People from Bordon
Alton F.C. players
Wessex Football League players